The Chocolate Habanero pepper is a cultivar of the habanero chili, which has been selectively bred to produce spicier, heavier, and larger fruit, ultimately more potent than its derivative.

Description 
Black habanero is an alternative name often used to describe the dark brown variety of chocolate habanero chilis (although they are slightly different, being slightly smaller and slightly more sphere-shaped). Some seeds have been found which are thought to be over 7,000 years old.  The black habanero has an exotic and unusual taste, and is hotter than a regular habanero with a rating between 425,000 and 577,000 Scoville units. Small slivers used in cooking can have a dramatic effect on the overall dish. The chocolate habaneros take considerably longer to grow than other habanero chili varieties. In a dried form, they can be preserved for long periods of time, and can be reconstituted in water then added to sauce mixes. Previously known as habanero negro, or by their Nahuatl name, their name was translated into English by spice traders in the 19th century as "black habanero". The word "chocolate" was derived from the Nahuatl word, xocolātl , and was used in the description, as well (as "chocolate habanero"), but it proved to be unpronounceable to the British traders, so it was simply named "black habanero".

Pungency 
The Chocolate Habanero can be double the heat of an orange habanero. They taste somewhat smokier than normal habaneros.

See also 
 Race to grow the hottest pepper
 Scoville scale
 Habanero pepper
 Ghost pepper

References 

Chili peppers
Capsicum cultivars